Adnan Ahmed is a Pakistani politician who was a Member of the Provincial Assembly of Sindh, from May 2013 to May 2018.

Early life and education

He was born on 9 October 1980 in Karachi.

He has a Bachelor of Engineering degree from NED University Karachi.

Political career

He was elected to the Provincial Assembly of Sindh as a candidate of Mutahida Quami Movement from Constituency PS-118 Karachi-XXX in 2013 Pakistani general election.

References

Living people
Sindh MPAs 2013–2018
1980 births
Muttahida Qaumi Movement politicians